The Battle of Savitaipal took place on June 3, 1790 during the Russo-Swedish War (1788–90), between Sweden and the Russian Empire. The Swedes lost the battle and had to withdraw with a loss of 372 men killed, wounded and captured or 750 according to Russian sources. The Russians estimated their casualties at 60 men killed and wounded, whereas the Swedes claimed to have killed 800.

References

Savitaipal
1790 in Europe
Savitaipal
Savitaipal
Savitaipal
History of South Karelia